Iván García Solís (born 19 June 1936) is a Mexican politician affiliated with the Party of the Democratic Revolution (formerly to the Unified Socialist Party of Mexico). As of 2014 he served as Deputy of the LIX Legislature of the Mexican Congress representing the Federal District.

References

1936 births
Living people
People from Mexico City
Unified Socialist Party of Mexico politicians
Party of the Democratic Revolution politicians
Deputies of the LIX Legislature of Mexico
Members of the Chamber of Deputies (Mexico) for Mexico City